Kawennáhere Devery Jacobs (born August 8, 1993), known professionally as Devery Jacobs, is an Indigenous Canadian (Kanien'keha:ka (Mohawk)) actress and writer. For her performance in Rhymes for Young Ghouls (2013), she garnered a Canadian Screen Awards nomination for Best Actress. In 2023, for her role on Reservation Dogs, she was nominated for a Critics' Choice Television Award for Best Actress in a Comedy Series.

Career
Jacobs began acting in the late 2000s with role in the television series The Dead Zone (2007) and Assassin's Creed: Lineage (2009).

In 2013, Jacobs played the lead character in  Rhymes for Young Ghouls, which premiered at the 2013 Toronto International Film Festival. For her work in the film, Jacobs will be nominated for a Canadian Screen Award for Best Actress in a leading role.

In 2014, she appeared in the music video for A Tribe Called Red's "Sisters".

In 2019, in the second season of American Gods, Jacobs played a young Cherokee college student, Sam Black Crow, who identifies as "two-spirited". In an interview, she said that Neil Gaiman (author of the novels on which the series is based) advocated strongly for her to be cast in the role, but noted: "I identify as queer, and not two-spirited, because I’m Mohawk and we don’t have that."

Also in 2019, Jacobs played a recurring role as Lilith Bathory in the first and second season of the Netflix series The Order.

Since 2021 Jacobs has played a leading role on the acclaimed TV series Reservation Dogs about a group of Indigenous teenagers growing up on a reservation in rural Oklahoma. For the role, she was nominated for a Critics' Choice Television Award for Best Actress in a Comedy Series in 2023. In season 2, she also joined the writer's room of the show.

Personal life
Jacobs is Kanien'keha:ka (Mohawk). At the time of her performance in Rhymes for Young Ghouls, Jacobs was a student at John Abbott College, studying correctional intervention. She identifies as queer.

Filmography

Awards

References

External links

Deveryjacobs.com

Anglophone Quebec people
Canadian film actresses
Canadian television actresses
First Nations actresses
Actresses from Quebec
Canadian Mohawk people
Living people
Native American actresses
21st-century Canadian actresses
Native American actors
21st-century First Nations people
1993 births
Canadian Film Centre alumni
Canadian video game actresses
People from Montérégie
Canadian LGBT actors
LGBT First Nations people
Queer actresses
Queer women
21st-century Canadian LGBT people